Group A of the 2011 Fed Cup Europe/Africa Zone Group I was one of four pools in the Europe/Africa zone of the 2011 Fed Cup. Three teams competed in a round robin competition, with the top team and the bottom team proceeding to their respective sections of the play-offs: the top team played for advancement to the World Group II Play-offs, while the bottom team faced potential relegation to Group II.

Switzerland vs. Great Britain

Switzerland vs. Denmark

Denmark vs. Great Britain

See also
Fed Cup structure

References

External links
 Fed Cup website

2011 Fed Cup Europe/Africa Zone